The 1975–76 Midland Football Combination season was the 39th in the history of Midland Football Combination, a football competition in England.

Division One

Division One featured 16 clubs which competed in the division last season along with two new clubs:
Cadbury Heath, joined from the Gloucestershire County League
Coleshill Town, promoted from Division Two

League table

References

1975–76
M